is a 2015 party video game. It was developed by NDcube and published by Nintendo for the Wii U. It was the only game in the series released for the Wii U, and was followed by Super Mario Party for the Nintendo Switch in 2018. Mario Party 10 received mixed reviews from critics. Critics praised the Bowser Party mode, the minigames, and utilization of the Wii U GamePad, but the decision to keep the gameplay changes first introduced in Mario Party 9 was criticized.

Gameplay

Mario Party 10 continues the tradition of the Mario Party series, in which four players, controlled by either human or CPU, compete against each other on a game board by participating in various minigames, of which there are 75 in total. Akin to Mario Party 9, the four characters travel across each board in a vehicle, increasing the collaborate aspect of the game. Players earn Mini Stars throughout the board; the player with the most Mini Stars at the end wins.

Along with the standard competitive modes, the game introduces two new modes called Bowser Party and Amiibo Party.

The boards feature the same play style introduced in Mario Party 9, in which all four players travel across the board together in a car. If, collectively, all six possible numbers of the dice block are hit, Bowser appears and takes half of the Mini-Stars from the player who freed him.

Bowser Party mode
In Bowser Party, a fifth player controls Bowser using the Wii U GamePad. In this mode, the four main players are tasked with reaching the end of the board without losing all of their hearts. Each player takes it turn to roll the dice and move forward, dealing with traps and special events; at certain junctures, the active player of the group must also decide on which route to take to progress. Landing on certain spaces will see the player either earn special dices to use, a chance to earn more hearts, be hindered by Bowser Jr., and impacting how many dice the fifth player has on their turn. On each board, the player will deal with a mini-boss who, when defeated, will confer additional hearts to each player. If a main player has lost all their hearts, they can be brought back into play if the others can earn some additional hearts on the board; while inactive, they can provide the group with special dice to use.

After the main players have taken a turn each, the fifth player takes their turn, and rolls four dice - if the total rolled is less than the number of the spaces the main players are from them, the fifth player can reroll their dice a second time. If the fifth player manages to catch the main group, a minigame takes place where they use the GamePad to attempt to weaken and defeat the main players - these minigames are randomly selected, except under certain conditions. On some boards, the fifth player will get to hinder the main players by tricking them into setting off traps or facing a disadvantage on a specific route.

If the main players are close to the goal, the fifth player will be able to gain an advantage such as adding more Bowser Jr. spaces to hinder the group. Should the main players reach the end of the board, the active player must find and secure a star from one of three enemies to win the game - a wrong choice will remove that enemy, but push the team back a few spaces; if only one of the enemies remains, reaching the end at that point will win the game for the main players. The fifth player will win the game if they can defeat all the other players before they can achieve this.

Amiibo Party mode
Amiibo Party involves up to four Amiibo characters playing on boards designed for those characters. Players who own an Amiibo are represented on the board by a three-dimensional figure, while players without one are represented by a two-dimensional cardboard cut-out. This mode is similar in gameplay to the original Mario Party series through Mario Party DS. The compatible characters include Mario, Luigi, Peach, Toad, Bowser, Yoshi, Donkey Kong, Wario, and Rosalina.

Reception

Mario Party 10 received generally mixed reviews from critics, earning aggregate scores of 66/100 from Metacritic. Critics praised the graphics and minigames, but had complaints towards the linear boards and luck-based gameplay. Bowser Party was praised for being fun with friends and making good use of the GamePad, but Amiibo Party was criticized for having dull boards and the requirement for the player to touch their Amiibo to the GamePad every time they needed to make any sort of selection.

Samuel Claiborn of IGN gave it a 6.5 out of 10, saying that it "carries over some bad ideas from Mario Party 9 that continue to deflate the fun." Mark Walton of GameSpot gave Mario Party 10 a score of 6 out of 10 with his main complaint being it is too familiar to past games. He felt the game lacks lasting appeal and wears thin quickly. "Despite the Amiibo additions and GamePad Bowser games, as well as a delightfully bright and colourful aesthetic, it's hard to ignore just how similar this game is to its predecessors. But even if you could overlook it, the fact remains that even with some fun minigames in tow and a good group of friends to enjoy it with, Mario Party 10 just doesn't have the depth or the challenge to hold your attention for long."

Sales
In the United Kingdom, the Mario Party 10 had the second best launch in the series, behind Mario Party 8. In the United States, roughly 290,000 physical and downloaded copies of the game had been sold by the end of March 2015. This was faster than Mario Party 9, which only sold 230,000 in around three weeks. In Japan, Mario Party 10 underperformed compared to the previous game, selling about 50,000 copies in its first week. As of late June 2015, over 159,000 copies had been sold in Japan. As of September 30, 2021, the game has worldwide sales of 2.27 million copies and is the tenth best selling game on the Wii U.

Notes

References

2015 video games
Asymmetrical multiplayer video games
Mario Party
Multiplayer and single-player video games
NDcube games
Nintendo Network games
Party video games
Video game sequels
Video games about size change
Video games developed in Japan
Video games set in amusement parks
Video games that use Amiibo figurines
Wii U eShop games
Wii U games
Wii U-only games
de:Mario Party#Mario Party 10